Uncha Siwana is a census town in Karnal district in the Indian state of Haryana.

Demographics
 India census, Uncha Siwana had a population of 10,609. Males constitute 65% of the population and females 35%. Uncha Siwana has an average literacy rate of 75%, higher than the national average of 59.5%: male literacy is 85%, and female literacy is 58%. In Uncha Siwana, 10% of the population is under 6 years of age.

References

Cities and towns in Karnal district